Wadi Al-Seer  or Wadi as-Seer (meaning "Valley of the Orchards") is an area in the Greater Amman Municipality named after a prehistoric queen that ruled the area, Queen Seer. It consists of ten neighborhoods, some of which are residential, other commercial, or both.

Neighborhoods
Wadi Al-Seer district contains ten neighbourhoods; Al-Rawabi, Swefieh, Jandaweel, Al-Rawnaq, Al-Sahl, Al-Diyar, Bayader, Al-Sina'a, Al-Kursi and west Umm Uthaina.

Bayader Wadi Al-Seer
Bayader Wadi as-Seer neighbourhood is a small low-income town on the outskirts of the Greater Amman Municipality. It contains some Ottoman-era buildings and mosques from the early 20th century. 10 kilometres outside Wadi as-Seer are the ruins of the Qasr al-Abd castle and the related caves of Iraq al-Amir. Wadi as-Seer city contains a well known historical courthouse, an old fort, an entire Ottoman-style neighbourhood standing on extremely steep hills that are enveloped by European narrow streets.

The area is on the extreme outskirts of the city and overlooks some of the mountains that the city is built on.

The name of the neighbourhood is an archaic Levantine compound noun, it roughly translates to "the Threshing Floor of the Valley of the Orchards".

Sweifieh

Sweifieh, one of the most important cultural neighborhoods of the capital Amman, is located in the Wadi as-Seer district. The neighborhood is home to several entertainment, clubbing and shopping industries of the country.

In Sweifieh has a lot of family-oriented spots. The malls of Sweifieh are usually filled by families during the days and afternoons, whereas the same spots are occupied by a younger crowd during the night time. Sweifieh also has a high number of renowned schools, such as The English School, the British International Community School, the Modern American School, and the First Patriarch Diodoros School, a Greek Orthodox school.

Sweifieh is home to the Albaraka Mall, one of the most influential malls in the district due to its beautiful and bizarre glass architecture and its iconic cinema complex.

Culture
Wadi as-Seer has a quite distinctive culture which shapes that of the rest of the city. The municipality has a large number of North Caucasian and North American residents. The Sweifieh district is also home to the fashion industry of the municipality and the rest of the city. Wadi as-Seer city has historic architecture, such as the old courthouse, the old fort and Ottoman styled neighbourhood which stands on the extremely steep western hills.

However, Wadi as-Seer's outer neighborhoods do not affect the culture of the area, due to the fact that a high percentage of the population is low-income, unlike the rich and wealthy inhabitants of Abdoun and Sweifieh. In general, the culture of Sweifieh and Abdoun is based upon media, fashion, finance and shopping; which is a very important aspect of the everyday lives of that areas' residents. The film and music studios in the city are located in these areas, and most of the city's artists and celebrities prefer to reside here. Some of the disadvantages of residing in the area are the congested population and non-stop traffic.

Climate
The climate in Wadi as-Seer is quite similar to the rest of the city, with variations of 5 degrees Celsius between some of its districts. Due to the quite high elevation of the valley, it sees warm and pleasant summers and cold rainy winters with the occasional snow. The Abdoun Valley sees warmer temperatures than the rest of the district due to its elevation but receives approximately the same amount of precipitation during the winter. The valley isn't usually windy during the winter, but the summers enjoy beautiful breezes day and night long. The entire city generally and Wadi as-Seer specifically suffer from strong fog episodes during the winter, and somewhat intense haze or smog during the summer.

References

Populated places in Amman Governorate
Districts of Amman